Syms School of Business (formerly the Syms School of Business) is Yeshiva University business school. It offers both undergraduate and graduate business programs at the Wilf Campus in New York's Washington Heights neighborhood, and at the Beren Campus in New York’s Murray Hill neighborhood.

The school offers the combination of a complete business curriculum, affording preparation with a base in liberal arts studies.

Background 

Established in 1987 through a $22 million endowment from businessman and philanthropist Sy Syms and other business leaders, the school offers a business curriculum along with a Jewish studies component for undergraduates.

Jewish tradition provides the framework for consideration of ethical issues in classes. All Sy Syms students are required to attend one of the four schools of Jewish studies.

It is accredited as a business school by the Association to Advance Collegiate Schools of Business.

Campus and facilities 
The main building on Wilf Campus is the 235 ft tall Belfer Hall that was originally built in 1968 for the use of Wurzweiler School of Social Work & Bernard Revel Graduate School of Jewish Studies but now shared by the three schools. Belfer Hall, named for philanthropists Diane and Arthur Belfer, is one of the tallest educational structures in the world. The school's students live in the surrounding residence halls of Yeshiva University and make use of the surrounding facilities. Students can also have a productive workout at Syms Fitness Center located in Rubin Hall.

The graduate programs take place in the university's midtown Beren Campus located in Murray Hill.

Academics 
Students take business courses through the Sy Syms School of Business and complete their liberal arts requirements at Yeshiva College or Stern College for Women. Women undertake their Jewish studies at Stern, while men attend one of four Jewish studies options:

 James Striar School of General Jewish Studies/Mechinah Program
 Yeshiva Program/Mazer School of Talmudic Studies
 Isaac Breuer College of Hebrew Studies
 Irving I. Stone Beit Midrash Program

Majors and minors offered include accounting (an optional 5-year program leading to a B.S/M.S. in Accounting); finance; general business; international business; management; management information systems; and marketing. The accounting program was recently ranked by Business Insider as a top 25 accounting program to attend based on top tier job placement for graduates.

A general business minor is offered to students majoring in Yeshiva University's liberal arts college, Yeshiva College. Additionally, Syms students may be able to pursue a minor in a subject area in Yeshiva College.

In addition, the school offers a selection of honors courses, with newly developed and successful honors program.

Graduate programs 
Sy Syms also offers graduate programs including a Master of Science in Accounting and an Executive MBA Program. Its graduate business programs are held at the Beren Campus in New York’s Murray Hill neighborhood.

The EMBA offers students state-of-the-art business knowledge in the context of the highest ethical ideals.  The Syms Executive MBA program curriculum was developed to challenge students to hone their business expertise in a way that prepares them to achieve their current and future professional goals.  In the summer of 2013, the first EMBA cohort traveled to Israel as part of their international residency requirement.

Entrepreneurship 
The Sy Syms School of Business maintains a strong focus on entrepreneurship.
The Rennert Entrepreneurial Institute is one of the nation's few undergraduate programs teaching the knowledge and skills necessary for creating and developing a business. The undergraduate program uses classroom instruction and hands-on experience to teach the intricacies of starting and managing a business. Students may take entrepreneurship courses as electives or as an integral part of the management concentration. The institute received its initial funding through a grant from Mr. and Mrs. Ira Rennert, for whom the Institute is named.
 The Doris and Dr. Ira Kukin Entrepreneurial Lecture Series allows students to interact with prominent CEOs and other business experts.

References

External links 
 Sy Syms School of Business
 Sy Syms School of Business Executive MBA Program

Yeshiva University
Business schools in New York (state)
Universities and colleges in New York City
Universities and colleges in Manhattan
Educational institutions established in 1987
1987 establishments in New York City